Kensington is a city in Smith County, Kansas, United States.  As of the 2020 census, the population of the city was 399.

History

Kensington was founded circa 1887. It was incorporated as a city in 1900.

Kensington was considered a discordant community in 1892. Many of the husbands and wives lived apart from each other and the society was deemed "broken apart on the account of it".

Kensington was located on the Chicago, Rock Island and Pacific Railroad.

The first post office in Kensington was established in January 1888.

Geography
Kensington is located at  (39.766110, -99.032308).

Demographics

2010 census
As of the census of 2010, there were 473 people, 203 households, and 126 families living in the city. The racial makeup of the city was 97.7% White, 0.2% Native American, and 2.1% from two or more races. Hispanic or Latino of any race were 0.2% of the population.

There were 203 households, of which 23.6% had children under the age of 18 living with them, 53.2% were married couples living together, 4.9% had a female householder with no husband present, 3.9% had a male householder with no wife present, and 37.9% were non-families. 36.5% of all households were made up of individuals, and 23.1% had someone living alone who was 65 years of age or older. The average household size was 2.19 and the average family size was 2.78.

The median age in the city was 49.7 years. 21.6% of residents were under the age of 18; 4.2% were between the ages of 18 and 24; 18.6% were from 25 to 44; 26.6% were from 45 to 64; and 29% were 65 years of age or older. The gender makeup of the city was 46.3% male and 53.7% female.

2000 census
As of the census of 2000, there were 529 people, 231 households, and 140 families living in the city. The racial makeup of the city was 97.35% White, 0.19% African American, 0.19% from other races, and 2.27% from two or more races. Hispanic or Latino of any race were 0.76% of the population.

There were 231 households, out of which 23.4% had children under the age of 18 living with them, 54.1% were married couples living together, 3.9% had a female householder with no husband present, and 39.0% were non-families. 37.7% of all households were made up of individuals, and 27.3% had someone living alone who was 65 years of age or older. The average household size was 2.16 and the average family size was 2.79.

In the city, the population was spread out, with 21.6% under the age of 18, 5.5% from 18 to 24, 19.5% from 25 to 44, 21.0% from 45 to 64, and 32.5% who were 65 years of age or older. The median age was 48 years. For every 100 females, there were 81.8 males. For every 100 females age 18 and over, there were 78.9 males.

The median income for a household in the city was $29,219, and the median income for a family was $41,250. Males had a median income of $28,333 versus $16,607 for females. The per capita income for the city was $15,131. About 3.4% of families and 5.1% of the population were below the poverty line, including 4.5% of those under age 18 and 3.9% of those age 65 or over.

Government
The Kensington government consists of a mayor and five council members.  The council meets the 2nd Monday of each month at 5:30PM.
 City Hall, 101 S Main.

Education
The community is served by Thunder Ridge USD 110 public school district. In 2008 West Smith County USD 238 and Eastern Heights USD 324 combined to form Thunder Ridge USD 110. The Thunder Ridge High School mascot is the Thunder Ridge Longhorns.

Prior to school unification, the Kensington High School mascot was Kensington Goldbugs.

References

Further reading

External links

 City of Kensington
 Kensington - Directory of Public Officials
 Kensington city map, KDOT

Cities in Kansas
Cities in Smith County, Kansas
1887 establishments in Kansas
Populated places established in 1887